Banana Mountain is a mountain located in Chaffee County, Colorado, United States.

References

Mountains of Colorado
Mountains of Chaffee County, Colorado
North American 3000 m summits